Dura is a Palestinian city located eleven kilometers southwest of Hebron, in the southern West Bank, in the Hebron Governorate of the State of Palestine. According to the Palestinian Central Bureau of Statistics, the town had a population of over 28,268 in 2007. The current mayor is Ahmad Salhoub.

In 1517, the village was incorporated into the Ottoman Empire with the rest of Syria. After the British Mandate, in the wake of the 1948 Arab–Israeli War, Dura came under Jordanian rule. Dura was established as a municipality on January 1, 1967, five months before it came under Israeli occupation after the Six-Day War. Since 1995, it has been governed by the Palestinian National Authority, as part of Area A of the West Bank and as part of the Hebron Governorate of the State of Palestine.

Etymology
The present-day name of Dura has been identified with ancient Adoraim or the Adora of 1 Macc.13.20 The village was originally built on two hills: Dura al-‘Amaira and Dura al-Arjan possibly reflecting dual grammatical number of Adoraim name, which could also be a double village during antiquity.

History

Ancient period 
Dura is an ancient place, where old cisterns and fragments of mosaics have been found. The settlement was mentioned in the Amarna letters as early as 14th century BC. and in the Anastasi Papyrus.

Classical period 
Following the Alexander the Great's conquest, the village population of the ancient Palestine preserved their traditional way of life, however Jewish urban centers such as Adoraim exhibited a degree of hellenization. The settlement is mentioned in the Zenon Papyri in 259 BC as a "fortress city". In Adora, Simon Maccabeus stopped the advancing Diodotus Tryphon army in 142 BC. According to Josephus, John Hyrcanus captured the city after the death of Antiochus VII in 129 BC. The city inhabitants, who were alleged to have been of Esau's progeny (Idumeans), were forced to convert to Judaism during the reign of Hyrcanus, on the condition that they be allowed to remain in the country. In 63 BC Pompey conquered Judea. Adora became a chief place of Idumaea, Hebron no longer being important. The city is included in the list of cities rebuilt by the Roman consul Aulus Gabinius.  It may have been the administrative center of the district of eastern Idumaea established by Gabinius, though other possibilities have been suggested.

A 1st century CE mansion, inhabited till First Jewish–Roman War (66-74 CE), was partially excavated near Dura, at Hirbet Moraq. The house, center of the estate, included bath and consistent of interior rooms surrounded by open courtyard and fronted by colonnades. According to inscription the house belonged to a Jewish family. This distinctive "introverted" house plan design developed in the area during the Hellenistic period. The city retained Jewish character until at least the end of the Bar Kokhba war (135 CE)

Early Muslim Period 
Mukaddasi, writing around  985 CE, noted that Palestine was famous for its vineyards and a type of raisin called Dūrī, said to be from Dura.

Ottoman period
In 1517, the village  was incorporated into the Ottoman Empire with the rest of  Palestine. In 1596 it appeared in the  tax registers as being in the Nahiya of Khalil of the Liwa of Quds. It had a population of 49 Muslim households. The villagers paid a fixed tax rate of 33,3% on agricultural products, including on wheat, barley, olives, vines or fruit trees, and goats or beehives; a total of 10,000  akçe.

In 1834, Dura's inhabitants participated in an uprising against the Egyptian Ibrahim Pasha, who took over the area between 1831 and 1840.
When Robinson visited in 1838, he described Dura as one of the largest villages in the area, and the residence  of the  Sheikhs of Ibn Omar, who had formerly  ruled the area.

In 1863 the French explorer Victor Guérin visited the place, and noted that "Fragments of ancient columns, and a good number of cut stones taken from old constructions
and built up in the Arab houses, indicating that Dura replaced a Judean city, and was built with its materials. Two barracks especially have been built in this way. Above the door of one, a block forming the lintel was once ornamented with mouldings, now very much mutilated. Close to the town is a celebrated wely in which lies a colossal sarcophagus, containing, it is said, the body of Noah."

An Ottoman  village list from about 1870 found that Dura had  a population of 420, in  144  houses, though the population count included men, only.  In 1877 Lieutenant Kitchener had some boys publicly flogged in Dura following an incident when stones were thrown at a member of the Palestine Exploration Fund survey party.

In 1883, the PEF's Survey of Western Palestine  described Dura as "A large and nourishing village on the flat slope of a hill, with open ground on the east for about a mile. This plain is cultivated with corn. To the north of Dura are a few olives, and others on the south. The houses are of stone. South of the village are two Mukams with white domes; and on the west, higher than the village, is the tomb of Neby Nuh (Prophet Noah). Near these there are rock-cut sepulchres. The place is well supplied from three springs on the east and one on the south."

British Mandate era

In the 1922 census of Palestine, conducted by the British Mandate authorities, Dura was  divided into Dura al-‘Amaira, with 2,565 inhabitants, and Dura al-Arjan, with 3,269 inhabitants; a total of 5,834, all Muslims. The report of the 1931 census wrote that "the village in the Hebron sub-district commonly known as Dura is a congeries of neighbouring localities each of which has a distinctive name; and, while Dura is a remarkable example of neighbourly agglutination, the phenomenon is not infrequent in other villages". The total of 70 locations listed in the report had 1538 inhabited houses and a population of 7255 Muslims.

In the 1945 statistics the population of Dura was 9,700, all Muslims, who owned 240,704 dunams of land  according to an official land and population survey. 3,917  dunams were plantations and irrigable land,  90,637  for cereals, while 226 dunams were built-up (urban) land. Dura village lands covered in this period an estimated , which included 99 ruined settlement sites.

Jordanian era
In the wake of the 1948 Arab–Israeli War, and after the 1949 Armistice Agreements, Dura came under Jordanian rule. 

In 1961, the population of Dura was  3,852.

Post-1967
Since the Six-Day War in 1967, Dura has been under Israeli occupation. The population in the 1967 census conducted by the Israeli authorities was 4,954.

The municipality of Dura was established on January 1, 1967, five months before it was occupied by Israel during the Six-Day War.

After the Palestinian National Authority was ceded control of the town in 1995, a local committee was set up to prevent land confiscation from the town and the municipal council was expanded. Many Palestinian ministries and governmental institutions opened offices in Dura, enhancing its role in Palestinian politics.

In 2011 the Dura International Stadium was renovated. It can hold up to 18,000 spectators and hosts national and international games.

The Dura Municipal Rehabilitation Center assists Palestinian Authority residents with special needs and developmental disabilities. Occupational therapy, visual rehabilitation for the seeing impaired, and outreach program are some of the services offered.

Dura has a public library, swimming pool, and a park which includes a children's theater. 

In June 2014, during the search to find three kidnapped boys, 150 Israeli soldiers stormed Dura's Haninia neighbourhood in a dawn raid to detain a person, and were met by young men and boys throwing rocks.  An Israeli soldier shot and killed a teenager who was among the rock throwers, 13 or 15-year-old Mohammed Dudeen.

Israeli settlement
The Israeli settlement of Adora, Har Hebron is located 4 kilometers north of the town in the Judean Mountains and has  inhabitants. The international community considers Israeli settlements in the West Bank illegal under international law, but the Israeli government dispute this. The settlement community falls under the jurisdiction of Har Hebron Regional Council.

Climate
The climate of Dura is dry in the summers and experiences moderate precipitation during winter. Average annual precipitation depend on specific geographic locations within the town. The area of Dahr Alhadaba receives an annual average of 400–600 mm of rain, southern slopes 300–400 mm and the northern region of the Dura hills 250–300.

Landmarks
A local Palestinian legend  has it that the patriarch Noah, in Islamic tradition Nebi Nûh,  was buried in Dura, and a shrine there commemorates this Arab tradition.

References

Bibliography

External links
Dura municipality official website
Welcome To The City of Dura
Dura, Welcome  to Palestine
Survey of Western Palestine, Map 21:    IAA, Wikimedia commons 
Dura Town (Fact Sheet),  Applied Research Institute–Jerusalem (ARIJ)
Dura Town Profile, ARIJ
Dura Area Photo, ARIJ
The priorities and needs for development in Dura town based on the community and local authorities' assessment, ARIJ
1946 survey with detailed plans.

 
Hebron Governorate
Cities in the West Bank
Throne villages
Municipalities of the State of Palestine